Petrelli is an Italian surname. It may refer to:

People 
 Elia Petrelli (born 2001), Italian football player
 Italo Petrelli, Italian bobsledder
 Sergio Petrelli (born 1944), Italian football player
 Valentino Petrelli (1922–2001), Italian photographer

Characters 
 Several characters of the Heroes
 Peter Petrelli, portrayed by Milo Ventimiglia
 Nathan Petrelli, portrayed by Adrian Pasdar
 Angela Petrelli, portrayed by Cristine Rose
 Arthur Petrelli
 Heidi Petrelli
 Simon & Monty Petrelli

Surnames
Italian-language surnames
Surnames from given names